Euteleostomi (Eu-teleostomi, where Eu- comes from Greek εὖ 'well, good' or Euteleostomes, also known as "bony vertebrates") is a successful clade that includes more than 90% of the living species of vertebrates.  Both its major subgroups are successful today: Actinopterygii includes most extant fish species, and Sarcopterygii includes the tetrapods.

Euteleostomes originally all had endochondral bone, fins with lepidotrichs (fin rays), jaws lined by maxillary, premaxillary, and dentary bones composed of dermal bone, and lungs.  Many of these characters have since been lost by descendant groups, however, such as lepidotrichs lost in tetrapods, and bone lost among the chondrostean fishes. Lungs have been retained in dipnoi (lungfish), and many tetrapods (birds, mammals, reptiles, and some amphibians). In many ray-finned fishes, lungs have evolved into swim bladders for regulating buoyancy, while in others they continue to be used as respiratory gas bladders.

Classification
Euteleostomi contains the following subgroups:

Actinopterygii
Actinopteri
Chondrostei
Neopterygii
Cladistia
Polypteriformes
Sarcopterygii
Actinistia
Coelacanthiformes
Dipnoi
Ceratodontimorpha
Tetrapodomorpha

Notes

Subnotes

References

External links
 Gnathostomata at the Tree of Life

 
Vertebrate taxonomy
Teleostomi
Pridoli first appearances
Extant Silurian first appearances

es:Euteleostomi